$#*! My Dad Says (pronounced "Bleep My Dad Says") is an American television sitcom produced by Warner Bros. Television that aired on CBS. It was based on the Twitter feed Shit My Dad Says, created by Justin Halpern and consisting of quotations from his father, Sam.

The show originally ran from September 23, 2010, to February 17, 2011, and aired on Thursdays at 8:30 pm/7:30 pm Central. After 18 episodes aired, the series was replaced in mid-season by Rules of Engagement, which had moved to Thursdays from Mondays.

On May 15, 2011, CBS canceled the series after one season.

Plot
Ed is a very opinionated 72-year-old who has been divorced three times. His two adult sons, Henry and Vince, are accustomed to his unsolicited and often politically incorrect rants. When Henry, a struggling writer and blogger, can no longer afford his rent, he is forced to move back in with Ed, which creates new problems in their tricky father–son relationship. As weeks go by Henry is unable to find a job as a writer, mostly due to the lack of good material. He finally lands a job,  when during his interview Ed interrupts with an irrational phone call that sparks the interest of the eccentric editor conducting the interview. Henry is ultimately hired, but is forced to continue living with Ed in order to have readily available material via his father's unsolicited rants, hence the title $#*! My Dad Says.

Cast
 William Shatner as Dr. Edison Milford "Ed" Goodson III
 Jonathan Sadowski as Henry Goodson
 Will Sasso as Vince Goodson
 Nicole Sullivan as Bonnie Goodson
 Tim Bagley as Tim

Development and production
In November 2009, CBS announced that it was developing a television pilot based on the Twitter feed, which would be written by Halpern and Patrick Schumacker. William Shatner landed the lead role in late February 2010, which triggered a green-light to produce the pilot. Nicole Sullivan and Ryan Devlin came on board in early March. Casting was completed with the addition of Will Sasso as Vince and Stephanie Lemelin as Sam later that month. Both Sasso and Sullivan had previously been cast-mates on the series Mad TV.

The series was picked up by CBS in May 2010, with reports saying that the role of Henry (played by Ryan Devlin in the pilot) would be recast. In July, Jonathan Sadowski was cast in the role. The character Sam (Stephanie Lemelin) was eliminated, never appearing in the broadcast pilot or subsequent episodes.

Episodes

Reception
$#*! My Dad Says received negative reviews, with Metacritic assigning it a score of 28/100. On Rotten Tomatoes, the series has a score of 0% based on 26 critic reviews. The website’s consensus reads: "$#*! My Dad Says features childish jokes, abysmal writing, and the half-baked stunt casting of William Shatner." Over 12 million viewers watched the premiere, although the next two episodes lost nearly 20% of that audience. The fourth and fifth episodes improved in ratings, being 10.16 million and 10.91 million respectively. The show won the award for Favorite New TV Comedy at the 37th People's Choice Awards on January 5, 2011.

Controversy
The title of the broadcast series was modified from the source material in order to comply with Federal Communications Commission regulations on the use of profane language during prime time. The profanity was also toned down and modified from Halpern's Twitter feeds.

On May 19, 2010, CBS announced the show's official name and 8:30 pm time slot at its upfront presentation of the fall 2010 schedule. Addressing reporters' concerns regarding the title, the network assured them that the expletive would not be used in promos. Soon thereafter, the Parents Television Council announced that it was protesting the title because it alluded to an obscenity. The PTC threatened CBS with broadcast license challenges for any affiliate airing the show or its promos before 10 pm.

Responding to the controversy, CBS stated, "[The show] will in no way be indecent and will adhere to all CBS standards. Parents who choose to do so will find the show can be easily blocked using their V Chip." Show star Shatner commented on the show's title, saying "We say spit; why can't we say shit?"  In addition, Bill Gorman from TVbytheNumbers wrote that the PTC protest was just giving the show more publicity, which he expected would boost ratings.

At the July 2010 Television Critics Association press tour, Shatner further commented on the title saying, "The word 'shit' is around us. It isn't a terrible term. It's a natural function. Why are we pussyfooting?"

See also
Surviving Jack, a second series surrounding the blog posts by Justin Halpern

References

Notes

External links
 

2010s American sitcoms
2010 American television series debuts
2011 American television series endings
CBS original programming
English-language television shows
Television series based on Internet-based works
Television series by Warner Bros. Television Studios
Television shows set in San Diego